"Ad Lib" is a TV program hosted by composer and pianist Phil Moore and produced by Cinema Arts Productions Inc. that aired in 1981.  Ad Lib featured noted jazz artists performing for the video camera while recording their musical albums at various recording studios. The series was repeated in 1982 and in 1984.

Season 1, Episode 1: Marilyn McCoo & Billy Davis Jr.
Season 1, Episode 2: Kenny Burrell & Ernie Andrews
Season 1, Episode 3: Jimmy Smith
Season 1, Episode 4: Jon Hendricks
Season 1, Episode 5: Dianne Reeves & Snooky Young*
Season 1, Episode 6: Jeanne Moore & Marshall Royal
Season 1, Episode 7: Dorothy Donegan/Mary Davis/The Tonight Show All-Stars
Season 1, Episode 8: O.C. Smith & Scatman Crothers
Season 1, Episode 9: Freda Payne & Stanley Turrentine
Season 1, Episode 10: Red Norvo/Clora Bryant/Rozelle Gayle
Season 1, Episode 11: Legends of Jazz: Dixieland
Season 1, Episode 12: Jimmy Witherspoon/John Collins
Season 1, Episode 13: Linda Hopkins/Paul Smith
Season 1, Episode 14: Dianne Reeves/James Newton/Allan Iwohara
Season 1, Episode 15: Jimmy Witherspoon/Marshall Royal
Season 1, Episode 16: Maxine Weldon/Greg Poree
Season 1, Episode 17: Freda Payne/Jerome Richardson
Season 1, Episode 18: O.C. Smith/Judy Carmichael
Season 1, Episode 19: Willie Bobo: 1
Season 1, Episode 20: Linda Hopkins/Eddie 'Lockjaw' Davis
Season 1, Episode 21: Ester Phillips/Red Holloway
Season 1, Episode 22: Spanky Wilson/Eddie 'Cleanhead' Vinson
Season 1, Episode 23: Dorothy Donegan/Spanky Wilson
Season 1, Episode 24: Dorothy Donegan/Buster Cooper
Season 1, Episode 25: Billy Daniels/Eddie Harris
Season 1, Episode 26: Billy Daniels/Blossom Dearie
Season 1, Episode 27: Michael Rogers Band/Dee Dee Gray
Season 1, Episode 28: Michael Rogers Band/Kiki Francisco
Season 1, Episode 29: Willie Bobo: 2
Season 1, Episode 30: Willie Bobo: 3
Season 1, Episode 31: Maxine Weldon/Pee Wee Crayton: 1
Season 1, Episode 32: Maxine Weldon/Pee Wee Crayton: 2
Season 1, Episode 33: Damita Jo/Papa John Creach
Season 1, Episode 34: Damita Jo/Papa John Creach 2
Season 1, Episode 35: Bill Henderson/Joyce Collins/Dave Mackay
Season 1, Episode 36: Sam Fletcher/Pee Wee Crayton
Season 1, Episode 37: Kenny Rankin/Terry Gibbs
Season 1, Episode 38: Dianne Reeves/Billy Childs
Season 1, Episode 39: Dianne Reeves/Ronald Powell
Season 1, Episode 40: Freddie Hubbard: 1
Season 1, Episode 41: Freddie Hubbard: 2
Season 1, Episode 42: Tanya Maria/Laurindo Almeida (#1)
Season 1, Episode 43: Tanya Maria/Laurindo Almeida (#2)
Season 1, Episode 44: Charles Brown/Mundell Lowe
Season 1, Episode 45: Mark Murphy/Pete & Conte Condoli 1
Season 1, Episode 46: Mark Murphy/Pete & Conte Condoli 2

References

1980s American music television series